The UK Rock & Metal Albums Chart is a record chart which ranks the best-selling rock and heavy metal albums in the United Kingdom. Compiled and published by the Official Charts Company, the data is based on each album's weekly physical sales, digital downloads and streams. In 2013, there were 29 albums that topped the 52 published charts. The first number-one album of the year was Muse's sixth studio album The 2nd Law, which was released the previous year. The first new number-one album of the year was Wretched and Divine: The Story of the Wild Ones, the third studio album by Black Veil Brides. Muse also had the final number-one UK Rock & Metal Albums Chart number one of the year with the live album Live at Rome Olympic Stadium, which spent three weeks at number one in December.

The most successful albums on the UK Rock & Metal Albums Chart in 2013 were Biffy Clyro's sixth studio album Opposites and the self-titled fourth studio album by Paramore, both of which spent a total of six weeks at number one during the year. Opposites was the best-selling rock and metal album of the year, ranking 35th in the UK End of Year Albums Chart, while Paramore ranked 76th. Queens of the Stone Age's sixth studio album ...Like Clockwork spent four weeks at number one, while four albums – Black Sabbath's 13, the Teenage Dirtbags compilation, Pearl Jam's Lightning Bolt and Muse's Live at Rome Olympic Stadium – were number one for three weeks in 2013. Two further albums – Muse's The 2nd Law and the Nickelback compilation The Best of Nickelback Volume 1 – each spent two weeks at number one in 2013.

Chart history

See also
2013 in British music
List of UK Rock & Metal Singles Chart number ones of 2013

References

External links
Official UK Rock & Metal Albums Chart Top 40 at the Official Charts Company
The Official UK Top 40 Rock Albums at BBC Radio 1

2013 in British music
United Kingdom Rock Albums
2013